Wall Municipal Airport  is a public-use airport located less than  northwest of Wall in Pennington County, South Dakota, United States. The airport is publicly owned by the City of Wall. The plans have completed the permitting stage but construction has not taken place as of March 2022.

References

External links

Airports in South Dakota